The Master of the World is a German science fiction movie made in 1934 (released in the US in 1935). Its themes are the ethical replacement of human labor by robots, and the threat to humanity by robots used as war machines. It was directed by Harry Piel and made by Ariel production.

Synopsis
Wolf, as the half-crazy assistant to Dr. Heller, an inventor of robots, murders his master and attempts to take over the world with his death-ray equipped robots. He then proceeds to lend industrial robots all over the world for high fees. "Baumann", a mining engineer and friend of Dr. Heller, then visits Wolf in his entrenched laboratory of Heller's company and learns about his plan. Having witnessed the despair of his co-workers who lost their jobs due to being replaced by robots he explains to Wolf that the people will revolt when they lose their jobs en masse. Wolf, however, wants to crush down any revolts using his war machines and reach for world domination. He is then prevented from attaining this goal by Baumann and Dr. Heller's widow, as he gets killed by his own invention.

In the happy end of the movie, Baumann realizes Dr. Heller's vision in which robots improve the lives of everyone and are used to do "dangerous, unhealthy and intellectually suffocating" jobs. The workers replaced by the robots don't lose their jobs but are instead employed in other areas – such as for the maintenance of the robots. Preserving workers' jobs also becomes a condition for the customers of the company's robots and thus humans are freed for a more worthy and humane life.

Cast
 Walter Janssen as Dr. Heller
 Sybille Schmitz as Vilma, seine Frau
 Walter Franck as Prof. Wolf
 Aribert Wäscher as Ehrenberg, Geheimrat (privy council)
 Siegfried Schürenberg as Werner Baumann
 Willi Schur as Karl Schumacher, Steiger
 Gustav Püttjer as Becker, Bergmann
 Klaus Pohl as Stöppke, Bergmann
 Oskar Höcker as Luppe, Bergmann
 Max Gülstorff as Neumeier, Berginspektor
 Otto Wernicke as Wolter, Oberingenieur
 Hans Hermann Schaufuß as Fischer, Bürodirektor

References

External links
 
 

1934 films
Films of Nazi Germany
Robot films
German science fiction films
1930s science fiction films
Films directed by Harry Piel
Films about artificial intelligence
Films about technological impact
1930s German-language films
German black-and-white films
Works about automation
Unemployment in fiction
1930s German films